Werewolf: The Last Warrior, known in Japan as , is a Nintendo Entertainment System platform game about a werewolf that made its debut in November 1990 in North America. It starred a werewolf character named "Warwolf".

Story
The game takes place on "Red Earth"—Earth's second colony planet. Dr. Faryan adventured into a cave and awoke an ancient evil that made him turn into an evil entity. Afterwards, Dr. Faryan created an army of evil mutants who imprisoned nearly everyone on Earth. The only hope for humanity is a man named Ken, the last of a tribe of changelings who has the ability to transform into a werewolf named "Warwolf".

Gameplay
Getting red "W"s will allow Ken to turn into a werewolf, granting him a longer-range melee attack, and a wall-climbing ability. Getting blue "W"s, while in werewolf form will make Ken turn back into a man. Getting bubbles will fill his anger meter and getting five of them will turn him into a super werewolf that can jump higher and do double damage for a limited time.

References

External links

1990 video games
Data East video games
Fictional werewolves
Nintendo Entertainment System games
Nintendo Entertainment System-only games
Platform games
Science fiction video games
Side-scrolling video games
Takara video games
Video games adapted into comics
Video games developed in Japan
Werewolf video games